Bolsheabishevo (Olo Äbeş) is a rural locality (a selo) and the administrative centre of Abishevsky Selsoviet, Khaybullinsky District, Bashkortostan, Russia. The population was 424 as of 2010. There are 7 streets.

Geography 
Bolsheabishevo is located 69 km southwest of Akyar (the district's administrative centre) by road. Maloarslangulovo is the nearest rural locality.

References 

Rural localities in Khaybullinsky District